Lists of people from African Union states are lists of people from each state of the African Union.

Alphabetical list

List of Angolans 
List of Botswana-related topics#Botswana people, List of Tswana people
List of Beninese (:Category:Beninese people)
List of Burkinabes
Outline of Burundi#Burundian people 
List of Cameroonians 
List of Cape Verdeans 
List of Central African Republic nationals (:Category:Central African Republic people)
List of Chadians 
List of Comorians 
 List of people from the Democratic Republic of the Congo
 List of people from the Republic of the Congo
List of Egyptians 
List of Equatorial Guinea nationals (:Category:Equatoguinean people)
List of Eritreans 
List of Ethiopians 
 List of Gabonese (:Category:Gabonese people)
List of Gambians (:Category:Gambian people)
List of Ghanaians 
List of Bissau-Guineans
List of Ivorians 
List of Kenyans 
List of people from Lesotho
List of Liberians
List of Libyans 
List of Malawians 
List of Malians 
List of Mauritanians (:Category:Mauritanian people)
List of Mauritians 
List of Moroccans 
List of Mozambicans 
List of Namibians 
List of Nigerians 
List of Rwandans 
List of Senegalese 
List of Sierra Leoneans 
List of Somalis 
List of South Africans 
List of Sudanese 
List of Swazis (:Category:Swazi people)
List of Tanzanians 
List of Togolese (:Category:Togolese people)
List of Tunisians (:Category:Tunisian people)
List of Ugandans 
List of Zambians 
List of Zimbabweans

Lists of people by location